The following is family tree of the Malay monarchs of Johor, from the establishment of the Old Johor Sultanate in 1528 until present day.

House of Melaka-Johor

House of Bendahara-Johor

House of Temenggong

References

Bibliography
 
 .
 
 

Johor